Bifeprunox (INN) (code name DU-127,090) is an atypical antipsychotic which, similarly to aripiprazole, combines minimal D2 receptor agonism with serotonin receptor agonism. It was under development for the treatment of schizophrenia but has since been abandoned.

Bifeprunox has a novel mechanism of action. Conventional antipsychotics are classed into typical and atypical. The typical antipsychotics, such as chlorpromazine and haloperidol, are potent D2 receptor antagonists. The atypical antipsychotics started with clozapine, these are classified as multireceptor interacting compounds, acting as an agonist towards 5-HT1A and an antagonist towards D2 receptors among other 5-HT and DA receptors. Bifeprunox and other novel atypical antipsychotics will instead of antagonizing D2 receptors, will act as partial agonists, as well as partial agonists towards 5-HT1A receptors.

In a multi-center, placebo-controlled study, 20 mg of bifeprunox was found to be significantly more effective than placebo at reducing symptoms of schizophrenia, with a low incidence of side effects.

An NDA for Bifeprunox was filed with the U.S. Food and Drug Administration in January 2007. The FDA rejected the application in August 2007. In June 2009, Solvay and Wyeth decided to cease development because "efficacy data did not support pursuing the existing development strategy of stabilisation of non-acute patients with schizophrenia."

Synthesis
A related structure is called Adoprazine.
Improved Synthesis:

The reaction of 3-bromobenzyl alcohol [15852-73-0] with mesyl chloride gives 3-bromobenzyl methanesulfonate [82732-02-3] (2). This is used to alkylate 7-piperazin-1-yl-3H-1,3-benzoxazol-2-one [105685-26-5] (1) leading to CID:28466745 (3). The additional benzene ring is added by Suzuki cross-coupling with phenylboronic acid, completing the synthesis of bifeprunox (4).

See also
 Aripiprazole
 Pardoprunox

References

5-HT7 agonists
Atypical antipsychotics
Phenylpiperazines
Carbamates
Benzoxazoles
Biphenyls